Frumușița is a commune in Galați County, Western Moldavia, Romania with a population of 5,165 people. It is composed of three villages: Frumușița, Ijdileni and Tămăoani.

References

Communes in Galați County
Localities in Western Moldavia
Populated places on the Prut